Herbert Christopher (born April 7, 1954) is a former professional American football player who played safety for four seasons for the Kansas City Chiefs in the National Football League.

1954 births
Living people
People from Thomasville, Georgia
Players of American football from Georgia (U.S. state)
American football safeties
Morris Brown Wolverines football players
Kansas City Chiefs players